Městečko is a municipality and village in Rakovník District in the Central Bohemian Region of the Czech Republic. It has about 500 inhabitants.

Geography
It lies on the border between the Křivoklát Highlands and Plasy Uplands. The built-up area is situated in the valley of the Rakovnický Stream and its tributary, the Ryšava Stream. The northern municipal border is formed by the Klíčava River and Klíčava Reservoir. The entire municipality lies in the Křivoklátsko Protected Landscape Area.

History
The first written mention of Městečko is from 1352, under the name Městec. The name Městečko first appeared in 1558. During the Hussite Wars, the settlement was completely destroyed and had to be rebuilt. The same situation was repeated during the  Thirty Years' War, after which no inhabitants remained in the village, and it was restored only after its end in 1648.

Sights
The landmark of Městečko is the Church of Saint James the Great. The originally Gothic church was baroque rebuilt into its current form in 1733.

Notable people
Josef Trousil (born 1935), athlete

References

External links

Villages in Rakovník District